Chadsia is a genus of flowering plants in the legume family, Fabaceae. It belongs to the subfamily Faboideae.

Species 
Accepted species in the genus include.

References

Millettieae
Fabaceae genera
Taxa named by Wenceslas Bojer